Mirza Shokr Allah Isfahani was a Persian statesman, who served as the chief accountant of the Safavid shah Tahmasp I (r. 1524–1576), and later as the grand vizier of shah Ismail II (r. 1576–77) briefly from August 1576 to June 1577, until he was replaced by the influential statesman Mirza Salman Jaberi.

He was the father of Mohammad Hossein Tabrizi.

References

Sources
 
 
 

Grand viziers of the Safavid Empire
Politicians from Isfahan
16th-century Iranian politicians
16th-century births
Year of death unknown
16th-century people of Safavid Iran